Nuorteva is a surname. Notable people with the surname include:

Kerttu Nuorteva (1912–1963), Soviet intelligence agent
Santeri Nuorteva (1881–1929), Finnish-born Soviet journalist